The Barbados national football team represents Barbados in international association football under the control of the Barbados Football Association (BFA). 

The following list contains all results of Barbados's official matches since 2020.

Key

2020

2021

2022

2023

References

External links
RSSSF List of Matches
ELO List of Matches
National Football Teams List of Matches
Soccerway List of Matches
International-football.net List of Matches

See also
Barbados national football team results (2000–2019)

Barbados national football team